The Royal 22nd Regiment (R22R) is an infantry regiment of the Canadian Army. The headquarters of the regiment is at the Citadelle of Quebec in Quebec City, also the site of the regimental museum, and all three of its regular battalions are stationed at Canadian Forces Base Valcartier in Saint-Gabriel-de-Valcartier,  outside of Quebec City. The regiment serves as the "local" infantry regiment for the province of Quebec, where it draws most of its recruits.

History

While the Royal 22e Régiment commemorates the history and traditions of the Canadian Regiment of Fencible Infantry from the War of 1812 (also carrying resultant battle honours from the War of 1812), the modern ancestor of the regiment was formed in the early days of the First World War as part of the British Army, when volunteers from all over Canada were being massed for training at Valcartier, Québec, just outside Quebec City. The first contingent of 30,000 volunteers, which became the 1st Canadian Division of the Canadian Expeditionary Force, were grouped into numbered battalions, regardless of origin. The existing reserve regiments were not mobilized, due to the belief of the Defence Minister, Sam Hughes, that a new "efficient" structure was required. Once again the new structure did not contain French-speaking units, such as those that had existed in the reserves. Over 1000 French-Canadian volunteers were scattered into different English-speaking units. This was not an oversight as Ontario (Hughes's political base) was in the process of outlawing both the teaching of French, as well as in the French language in their school system (Regulation 17) The predictable outrage in French Canada created a lack of support for the war of "King and Country", perceived as a mechanism to entirely annihilate the Francophone community in Canada.

The second contingent was more logically based on battalions raised and trained in the various military districts in which they were recruited, but remained using an impersonal numerical basis (with the exception of those with a Highland or Irish identity). Considerable political pressure in Quebec, along with public rallies, demanded the creation of French-speaking units to fight a war many viewed as being right and necessary, despite Regulation 17 in Ontario.

In September 1914, French Canadian pharmaceutical entrepreneur Arthur Mignault communicated with Prime Minister Robert Borden, to incite the formation of a solely French Canadian regiment. Mignault offered the government $50,000 to pursue this end. Borden had recently committed his country into the providing of half a million soldiers to the Allied cause, and was just realising how demanding honouring this promise would show. Borden eagerly accepted Mignault's proposal and accordingly, on 14 October 1914, the 22nd Battalion (French Canadian), CEF, was authorized. Mignault participated in the recruitment campaign, which resulted in a remarkable success; the ranks of the battalion were filled in less than a month. Arthur Mignault is as such considered the founder of the 22nd regiment.

The 22nd went to France as part of the 5th Canadian Brigade and the 2nd Canadian Division in September 1915, and fought with distinction in every major Canadian engagement until the end of the war. While other French speaking units were also created, they were all broken up upon arrival in France to provide reinforcements for the 22nd, which suffered close to 4000 wounded and killed in the course of the war. Two members of the 22nd were awarded the Victoria Cross in that war, Lieutenant Jean Brillant and Corporal Joseph Kaeble.

After the war, the 22nd Battalion was disbanded on 20 May 1919, sharing the fate of other numbered battalions of the Canadian Expeditionary Force. However, in the post-war reorganizations of the army, public pressure, such as resolutions by the Legislative Assembly of Quebec as well as the City Council of Quebec City, demanded that a permanent French-language unit be created in the peace-time Regular Force, and accordingly a new regiment was created, made up of veterans of the 22nd Battalion, on 1 April 1920. Initially the regiment, which was given the guard of the Citadelle of Quebec, was simply the 22nd Regiment, but in June 1921 King George V approved the renaming of it as The Royal 22nd Regiment. In 1928, the anomaly of a French-language unit with an English name was resolved, and the regiment became the Royal 22e Régiment in both languages. While in the Canadian Armed Forces, unit names are generally translated into the language of a text, traditional combat arms regiments are identified only in the single language of their troops, either English or French.  However, the English version of the R22eR is still seen occasionally, but strictly speaking it is incorrect; only "Royal 22e Régiment"  has been official in either language since 1928.

In 1940, the regiment became the first Francophone Canadian unit to mount the King's Guard in London and was the first of the three current Regular Force infantry regiments to do so.

In the Second World War, the regiment was part of the 3rd Canadian Infantry Brigade and the 1st Canadian Infantry Division and was involved in intense combat in Italy, (where Captain Paul Triquet earned the Victoria Cross) and later in the Netherlands and northwest Germany.

During the Korean War, 1951–1953, the regiment expanded to three battalions, each serving in turn as part of the Canadian brigade in the 1st Commonwealth Division. Thus the "Van Doos" represented one-third of Canada's infantry contingent throughout the war.

During the Cold War the regular battalions of the regiment served, in turn, in West Germany as part of 4 Canadian Mechanized Brigade Group, with the 1er Battalion serving permanently from 1967 until the withdrawal in 1993.

The regiment also served during the Oka Crisis. During the life of the Canadian Airborne Regiment (1968–1995) the 1er Commando was manned as a French-speaking sub-unit by soldiers of the Royal 22nd Regiment.

In the 1950s, the Canadian Army promoted a scheme of administratively associating reserve infantry regiments with a regular one. Although this project did not make much progress in most of the army, three reserve regiments did join the Van Doos, becoming battalions of the Royal 22e Régiment:

In the case of Les Fusiliers du St-Laurent, the battalion designation was in a subsidiary title, but it became nevertheless, administratively, part of the Royal 22e  Régiment. However, in 1968, Les Fusiliers du St-Laurent dropped the subsidiary title, and ended their administrative association with the R22eR.

Operational history

Fenian raids
The 64th Voltigeurs-de-Beauharnois were called out on active service from 9 to 29 April and from 24 to 31 May 1870. The battalion served on the Huntingdon frontier.

Great War
Details of the 64th Châteauguay and Beauharnois Regiment were placed on active service on 6 August 1914 for local protective duty.

The 22nd (French Canadian) Battalion, CEF was authorized on 7 November 1914 and embarked for Great Britain on 20 May 1915. It disembarked in France on 15 September 1915, where it fought as part of the 5th Infantry Brigade, 2nd Canadian Division in France and Flanders until the end of the war. The battalion was disbanded on 15 September 1920.

Second World War
The regiment landed in Sicily on 10 July 1943 and in Italy on 3 September 1943 as part of 3rd Brigade, 1st Canadian Infantry Division. On 16 March 1945, the regiment moved with the I Canadian Corps as part of Operation Goldflake to North-West Europe, where it fought until the end of the war. The overseas regiment was disbanded on 1 March 1946.

On 1 June 1945, a second Active Force component of the regiment was mobilized for service in the Pacific theatre of operations as the 1st Canadian Infantry Battalion, CASF. On 27 June 1946, it was embodied in the Permanent Force.

The details called to active service were disbanded on 31 December 1940.

The regiment subsequently mobilized the 1st Battalion, CASF for active service on 18 March 1942. It was re-designated as the 1st Airfield Defence Battalion (CIC, CASF on 19 July 1943, the 1st Airfield Defence Battalion, CIC, CASF on 1 January 1944 and the 1st Battalion, CIC, CASF on 1 September 1944. This unit served in Canada in a home defence role as part of the 7th Canadian Division, with three of its companies serving in Newfoundland. On 10 January 1945, the unit embarked for Great Britain, where it was disbanded on 18 January 1945 in order to provide reinforcements for the Canadian Army in the field.

The details called out on active service were disbanded on 31 December 1940. The regiment subsequently mobilized the 1st Battalion, CASF for active service on 3 January 1942. This unit served in Canada in a home defence role as part of Atlantic Command and in Newfoundland from April 1943 to September 1944. The battalion was disbanded on 14 January 1946.

United Nations operations – Korea
Three battalions of the Royal 22e Régiment served in the Republic of Korea as part of the 25th Canadian Infantry Brigade, 1st Commonwealth Division. The 2nd Battalion formed as part of the Special Force was the first to arrive in Korea, serving there from 4 May 1951 to 24 April 1952, followed by the 1st Battalion from 20 April 1952 to 21 April 1953 then the 3rd Battalion from 16 April 1953 to the Armistice on 27 July 1953.

Oka Crisis
In the summer of 1990, Canada deployed Van Doos to challenge Mohawk activists and warriors in Kanehsatà꞉ke and Kahnawake in a confrontation called the Oka Crisis.

Gulf War
'C' Company from the 1st Battalion, then based at CFB Lahr in West Germany as part of 4 Canadian Mechanized Brigade Group, served in Doha, Qatar, providing airfield security from 24 December 1990 to the end of March 1991.

Afghanistan 

The 3rd Battalion, along with an attached mechanized company from the 1st, provided the basis for the Canadian ISAF contingent in Kabul, Afghanistan, from February to August 2004.

In August 2007 the battle group based on the 3rd Battalion of the Royal 22e Régiment returned to Afghanistan, replacing the 2nd Battalion The Royal Canadian Regiment in Kandahar province. This battle group was made up of a company from each of the regiment's three regular battalions. It also included combat support and service support from all the units of 5 Canadian Mechanized Brigade Group in Valcartier, Quebec. There was a reconnaissance squadron from the 12e Régiment blindé du Canada, a composite tank squadron from Lord Strathcona's Horse (with troops from the other two armoured regiments), a battery from the 5e Régiment d'artillerie légère du Canada, an engineer squadron from 5 Combat Engineer Regiment. The battle group, awarded the Commander-in-Chief Unit Commendation, was "instrumental in dismantling improvised explosive device networks, re-capturing checkpoints and returning them to Afghan control, enhancing the capacity of Afghan forces and providing guidance on community building and local governance".

The Royal 22nd Regiment also provided about 150 trainers (in Operational Mentoring and Liaison Teams (OMLTs)) for the three Afghan "Kandaks" serving with them. As well it provided a protection company for the Provincial Reconstruction Team (PRT) in Kandahar.

The regiment distinguished itself in Kandahar through its determined and successful efforts to establish Afghan police sub-stations, protected by Afghan National Army and Canadian presence, in an ever-widening secure zone in the former Taliban home districts of Zhari and Panjawaii. Light infantry elements often fought toe-to-toe with the Taliban, relying heavily on sniper fire and man-portable grenade launchers to gain the edge over the militants. The battle group, and its associated OMLT and PRT elements, had 10 men killed in action during the six-month tour. The many wounded included Captain Simon Mailloux, a Van Doos platoon commander who returned two years later to Kandahar even though his leg had to be amputated.

A second Van Doos battle group, this time based on the 2nd Battalion, deployed to Kandahar from March to November 2009 and was the vanguard of the much-vaunted "key villages"  program, wherein Canadian soldiers cleared urban areas of Taliban activity during sweeping combat operations and then installed sub-units permanently in those hamlets, guarding the approaches to Kandahar City. The composition of this battle group was nearly identical to previous incarnations, and it was able to rely heavily on the recently deployed CH-146 Griffon and CH-47 Chinook helicopters to perform a wide variety of airmobile operations, as well as traditional mechanized manoeuvres. The Griffon helicopters proved especially capable at spotting Taliban movements and directing accurate artillery fire on them, preventing Taliban groups from effectively re-infiltrating areas previously cleared.

Over the course of the seven-month Rotation 7, ten soldiers from the battle group were killed in action ("Rotation 7" denoting that this was the eighth consecutive Canadian battle group deployment in Kandahar since 2006, as rotations are numbered starting at "0"). Five additional Canadian soldiers, all belonging to the battle group's parent organization, Task Force Kandahar, also died during that period. The vast majority of these soldiers were killed by the Taliban's lethal employment of anti-vehicle or anti-personnel improvised explosive devices.

The final Canadian combat mission began in the fall of 2010 with the 1st Battalion Battle Group (BG) commanded by Lieutenant-colonel Michel-Henri St. Louis. One of the main operations taken on by the BG was Operation Baawar beginning in December 2010 featuring a major road project and a strongpoint construction project led by engineers, tanks, and infantry.

Memorials
A stone shaft was erected on the grounds of Royal Military College Saint-Jean on 26 September 1964 to commemorate the founding of the Royal 22nd Regiment; the regiment trained at Fort Saint-Jean in 1914. The monument lists the regiment's battle honours.

Je me souviens (1989) by André Gauthier, a  bronze haut-relief bronze and granite wall memorial, was erected at Place George V in front of the Grande Allée Armoury in Quebec City. Unveiled on 11 November 1989, the sculpture honours the memory of the soldiers from the Royal 22e Régiment who were killed during the First and Second World Wars and the Korean War. The sculptor was inspired by A.T.C. Bastiens' painting L'Avance at the Canadian War Museum. The names of soldiers are inscribed in granite on the monument.

There is a group of 28 gravestones of members of the Royal 22e Régiment who died between 1929 and 1960 in the Notre Dame de Belmont Cemetery in Quebec City. Four gravestones, dated 1929, 1935, 1938, 1938 feature a crown, beaver and regimental motto. Seven gravestones, dated 1939, 1941, 1941, 1942, 1942, 1942, 1947 feature the Maple Leaf and Canadian Forces cross. Seven gravestones feature the Canadian Forces cross dated 1954, 1954, 1955, 1955, 1955, 1954, 1960.

Battalions

Armouries

Battle honours

Battle honours in small capitals are for large operations and campaigns and those in lowercase are for more specific battles. Bold type indicates honours emblazoned on regimental colours.

Honorary distinction
The non-emblazonable honorary distinction DEFENCE OF CANADA - 1812-1815 - DÉFENSE DU CANADA.

Victoria Cross recipients

Corporal Joseph Kaeble† – 22nd Battalion, Canadian Expeditionary Force – Neuville-Vitasse, France – 8 June 1918
Lieutenant Jean Brillant† – 22nd Battalion, Canadian Expeditionary Force – near Amiens, France – 8–9 August 1918
Major Paul Triquet – Royal 22e Régiment – Casa Berardi, Italy – 14 December 1943

† – Awarded posthumously

Lineage

Royal 22e Régiment
Originated in Saint-Jean-sur- Richelieu, Quebec on 7 November 1914 as the 22nd (French Canadian) Battalion, CEF
Redesignated 7 June 1915 as the 22nd (French Canadian) "Overseas" Battalion, CEF
Permanent Active Militia component formed on 1 April 1920 designated as the 22nd Regiment
Redesignated 1 June 1921 as The Royal 22nd Regiment
Redesignated 15 June 1928 as the Royal 22e Régiment
Amalgamated 1 September 1954 with Le Régiment de Châteauguay, retaining the same designation
Amalgamated 2 February 1956 with Le Régiment de St. Hyacinthe, retaining the same designation.

4th Battalion, Royal 22e Régiment (Châteauguay)
Originated on 4 June 1869 in Beauharnois, Quebec as the Voltigeurs-Canadiens of Beauharnois
Redesignated 5 November 1869 as the 64th Voltigeurs de Beauharnois
Redesignated 8 May 1900 as the 64th Regiment "Voltigeurs de Beauharnois"
Amalgamated 1 May 1901 with the 76th Regiment "Voltigeurs de Châteauguay" and redesignated as the 64th Regiment of Rifles "Voltigeurs de Chateauguay"
Redesignated 1 March 1902 as the 64th Chateauguay and Beauharnois Regiment
Redesignated 29 March 1920 as Le Régiment Châteauguay et Beauharnois
Redesignated 15 March 1921 as Le Régiment de Châteauguay
Redesignated 15 December 1936 as Le Régiment de Châteauguay (Mitrailleuses)
Redesignated 16 March 1942 as the 2nd (Reserve) Battalion, Le Régiment de Châteauguay (Mitrailleuses)
Redesignated 1 June 1945 Le Régiment de Châteauguay (Mitrailleuses)
Redesignated 1 April 1946 as Le Régiment de Châteauguay
Amalgamated 1 September 1954 with the Royal 22e Régiment and designated as Le Régiment de Châteauguay (4th Battalion, Royal 22e Régiment)
Redesignated 27 April 1956 as the 4e Bataillon, Royal 22e Régiment (Châteauguay)
Redesignated 12 August 1977 in English as the 4th Battalion, Royal 22e Régiment (Châteauguay)

Fusiliers du St-Laurent
Redesignated 1 September 1954 as Les Fusiliers du St-Laurent (5th Battalion, Royal 22e Régiment). This was an affiliation not an amalgamation. Les Fusiliers du St-Laurent and the Royal 22e Régiment were separate and distinct regiments. 
Redesignated 9 November 1963 as Les Fusiliers du St-Laurent (5e Bataillon, Royal 22e Régiment)
Redesignated 1 April 1968 as Les Fusiliers du St-Laurent

76th Regiment "Voltigeurs de Châteauguay"
Originated 22 March 1872 in Sainte-Martine, Quebec as the 76th Battalion of Infantry or "Voltigeurs de Châteauguay"
Redesignated 18 March 1881 as the 76th Battalion of Rifles or "Voltigeurs de Châteauguay"
Redesignated 8 May 1900 as the 76th Regiment "Voltigeurs de Châteauguay"
Amalgamated 1 May 1901 with the 64th Regiment "Voltigeurs de Beauharnois" and redesignated as the 64th Regiment of Rifles "Voltigeurs de Chateauguay"

6th Battalion, Royal 22e Régiment
Originated 24 March 1871 in Saint-Hyacinthe, Quebec as the St. Hyacinthe Provisional Battalion of Infantry
Redesignated 12 December 1879 as the 84th "St. Hyacinthe" Battalion of Infantry
Redesignated 8 May 1900 as the 84th St. Hyacinthe Regiment
Redesignated 29 March 1920 as Le Régiment de St. Hyacinthe
Redesignated 3 January 1942 as the 2nd (Reserve) Battalion, Le Régiment de St. Hyacinthe
Redesignated 14 January 1946 as Le Régiment de St. Hyacinthe
Amalgamated 2 February 1956 with the Royal 22e Régiment and redesignated as the 6th Battalion, Royal 22e Régiment
Redesignated 9 November 1963 as the 6e Bataillon, Royal 22e Régiment
Redesignated 12 August 1977 in English as the 6th Battalion, Royal 22e Régiment

Lineage chart
Lineage of the units of the Royal 22e Régiment.

Perpetuations

War of 1812
7th Battalion, Select Embodied Militia
"Les Chasseurs"
Beauharnois Division
Beloeil Division
Boucherville Division
Chambly Division
Isle Jésus Division
St. Denis Division
St. Hyacinthe Division
St. Ours Division
Verchères Division
Canadian Regiment of Fencible Infantry

Order of precedence
Regular Force:

Reserve Force:

Alliances
 – The Royal Welsh
 – 4th Battalion, Mercian Regiment

Freedom of the city (military)
The Royal 22e Régiment exercises its freedom of the city annually in Quebec City on 3 July of each year. Quebec cities that have granted freedom of the city to the regiment include: Quebec City, Saint-Hyacinthe, Saint-Jérôme, Farnham, Saint-Jean-sur-Richelieu, Drummondville and Val-Bélair. Foreign cities that have granted freedom of the city to the regiment include: Werl, Germany; Lahr, Germany and Ortona, Italy on 14 April 1993.

In popular culture
The Van Doos are the subject of a 2011 National Film Board of Canada documentary  (English: The Van Doos in Afghanistan). The documentary was filmed in Afghanistan in March 2011. On 9 November 2011, the film was previewed for the families of 26 soldiers who had died during their mission in Afghanistan, at a ceremony at the Valcartier base. A commemorative mural by Canadian artist Dave Sopha was also unveiled.

Hyena Road is a 2015 Canadian war drama film shown in the Gala Presentations section of the 2015 Toronto International Film Festival. The title comes from  built in Afghanistan in 2010–2011 by 1 R22eR Battle Group. The film features an English-speaking Princess Patricia's Canadian Light Infantry battle group, reflecting the language of the target audience.

Royal 22e Régiment Music
The song L'immortel 22ème Canadien-français by Paul Ravennes (music), and Léon Chevalier (words) was published by J.E. Belair, Montreal. The first line is: Gloire au vailland 22ème, a lui la palme de vainqueur; Refrain: Vaillants soldats, vos noms dans notre histoire.
 Jean F. Pierret, conductor "La Citadelle; la musique du Royal 22e Régiment" (1975 Trans-Canada Musique Service Inc., 7033, route Transcanadienne, Saint-Laurent, Québec H4T 1S2) 
 Victor Falardeau & Jean Parent, conductor "La musique du Royal 22e Régiment: 50 ans d'histoire, 1922-1972" (Québec: Editions Garneau, 1976) 
Capt. J.P. Armand Ferland, conductor "The Van Doos: the band of the Royal 22e Régiment" (RCA Victor Canada International, PCS-1007) 
"Recueil de chants du Royal 22e Régiment" (Val-Cartier: s.n., 197-?)

Arms

See also

 The Canadian Crown and the Canadian Forces
 List of Canadian organizations with royal patronage
33rd Vaudreuil and Soulanges Hussars

Explanatory notes

References

Further reading

 Bernier, Serge Le Royal 22e Régiment, 1914–1999 (Québec-Livres, 2185, autoroute des Laurentides, Laval, QC H7S 1Z5 Montréal: Art Global, 1999) 
 Bernier, Serge; translated by Phillips, Charles The Royal 22e Régiment, 1914–1999 (Montreal: Art Global, 2000)
 Boissonnault, Charles-Marie; Lamontagne, Léopold, Histoire du Royal 22e Régiment (Région du Royal 22e Régiment, La Citadelle, Québec: Éditions du Pélican, 1964) 
 Cantin, Robert Le sacrifice du Royal 22e Régiment (de 1914 à 1999) (Sainte-Foy, Québec: Société de généalogie de Québec, 2004) 
 Castonguay, Jacques Les bataillons et le dépôt du Royal 22e Régiment: vingt ans d'histoire, 1945–1965 (La Citadelle, Québec: Régie du Royal 22e Régiment, 1974)
 Carpentier, Pierre 6e Bataillon, Royal 22e Régiment, 1956–2006 (Saint-Hyacinthe, Québec: Corporation de l'arsenal inc., 2011) Canadiana: 20120088282 
 Chantal, Denise & Rasmüssen, Louis Armand Hébert, le plus grand mutilé du Royal 22ième Régiment de la guerre 1939–1945 (La Baie, Québec: Denise Chantal, 1995) 
 Chauveau, Charles  Soixante-cinq ans d'histoire: notes historiques sur le Royal 22e Régiment (Québec: s.n. 1983). 
 Corriveau, Paul, Le Royal 22e Régiment: 75 ans d'histoire, 1914–1989 (Québec: Régie du Royal 22e Régiment, 1989)
 Dagenais, Maxime. "'Une Permission! ... C'est bon pour une recrue.' Discipline and Illegal Absences in the 22nd (French-Canadian) Battalion, 1915–1919". Canadian Military History 18, No. 4 (Autumn 2009): 3–16. 
 Madill, D. S. Le 2e Bataillon, Royal 22e Régiment et la Batterie 'Q', 5e Régiment d'artillerie légère du Canada (Chypre: 1975 Presses Zavallis)
 Poulin, J. G. 696 heures d'enfer avec le Royal 22e Régiment: récit vécu et inspiré d'un journal tenu tant bien que mal au front (Québec: Éditions A-B, 1946)
 Poulin, J. G. Des héros connus, inconnus et méconnus du Royal 22e Régiment: 1939–1945 et la Corée (Québec: s.n., 1946)
 Royal Régiment, 22e. Mess des officiers du 2e Bataillon, Royal 22e Régiment: statuts et réglements. (Le Régiment, 1975)
 Serge Bernier, translation Terry Liston, ''The Van Doos', Québec, Les éditions GID, 2013, 215 p.

External links

 Royal 22e Régiment (Regimental website) (in French)
 Royal 22e Régiment on Facebook (in French)
 Le Royal 22e Régiment Canada avec la Fanfara Bersaglieri Italia on YouTube
 Hommage: Le Royal 22e Regiment
 Changing of the Guard: La Citadelle

Royal 22nd Regiment
1914 establishments in Quebec
Infantry regiments of Canada
Military units and formations of Quebec
Infantry regiments of Canada in World War II
Military units and formations established in 1914
Military units and formations of Canada in the Korean War
Military units and formations of Canada in World War II
Organizations based in Quebec City
Canada